Miyao (written: 宮尾) is a Japanese surname. Notable people with the surname include:

Ayaka Miyao, Japanese boxer
Daisuke Miyao, academic
, Japanese manga artist
, Japanese footballer
Paulo Miyao (born 1991), Brazilian practitioner of Brazilian jiu-jitsu

See also
Miyao Castle, a former castle of Itsukushima, Hiroshima Prefecture, Japan

Japanese-language surnames